James Philip Heatly (born 20 May 1997) is a British diver.

Career

In 2015, at the inaugural European Games held in Baku where the diving events are for juniors only, he won a gold in the 3 metre springboard, a bronze in the 1 metre springboard, as well as a silver in the men's synchronised 3 metre springboard with Ross Haslam.

At the 2018 Commonwealth Games he won bronze in the 1m springboard event, becoming only the second Scottish diver to win a diving medal after his grandfather Sir Peter Heatly won gold in 1958.

At the 2018 European Championships in Glasgow/Edinburgh, Heatly won a bronze in the men's 1 metre springboard.

At the 2019 European Diving Championships held in Kyiv, Heatly won bronze in the Men's 3m springboard.

At the 2021 FINA Diving World Cup held in Japan as an official test event for the 2020 Tokyo Olympics, Heatly won silver in the Men's 3m springboard event.

At the 2022 World Aquatics Championships, Heatly won his first World Championship medals, a bronze in the Mixed 3m & 10m team event with Andrea Spendolini-Sirieix, followed on the same day by a bronze in the mixed 3 metre synchro event with Grace Reid

He represented Scotland at the 2022 Commonwealth Games where he won a gold medal in the Mixed synchronised 3 metre springboard event alongside Grace Reid. and came 4th in the Men's 1 metre springboard and Men's 3 metre springboard events.

Media
James Heatly appeared in a short film "The Bath House" in 2009.

Personal life
Heatly is the grandson of fellow international diver Peter Heatly.

References

External links 
 
 
 
 
 
 
 
 
 

1997 births
Living people
British male divers
Scottish male divers
Olympic divers of Great Britain
Divers at the 2020 Summer Olympics
Commonwealth Games gold medallists for Scotland
Commonwealth Games bronze medallists for Scotland
Commonwealth Games medallists in diving
Divers at the 2014 Commonwealth Games
Divers at the 2018 Commonwealth Games
Divers at the 2022 Commonwealth Games
European Games medalists in diving
European Games gold medalists for Great Britain
European Games silver medalists for Great Britain
European Games bronze medalists for Great Britain
Divers at the 2015 European Games
Sportspeople from Winchester
World Aquatics Championships medalists in diving
Medallists at the 2018 Commonwealth Games
Medallists at the 2022 Commonwealth Games